Armando Enrique Polo Aguilar (born 2 April 1990) is a Panamanian professional football forward who plays for C.D. Luis Ángel Firpo.

Club career
A diminutive winger or forward, he started his career at local club Chepo and then had a spell at Sporting San Miguelito. In January 2012, he moved abroad to join Colombian side La Equidad but in July 2012, Polo returned to Panama to play for San Francisco. He then moved on to Río Abajo in January 2013 and had a second spell abroad at Costa Rican team Pérez Zeledón before returning to Río Abajo in January 2014 for another season. In August 2014, he was announced a new signing at Árabe Unido.

In January 2015 he was presented at Guatemalan outfit Coatepeque where he joined compatriot José Calderón, but Polo left them in April 2015 after he claimed the club failed to pay him his salary and he subsequently returned to Árabe Unido.

Sonsonate FC
After won the tournament with Tauro, Polo signed with Sonsonate FC of the Salvadoran Primera División.

Return to Sonsonate FC
In December 2018, Polo resigned with Sonsonate FC for the Clausura 2019.

International career
Polo made his debut for Panama in a March 2010 friendly match against Venezuela and has, as of 29 July 2015, earned a total of 4 caps, scoring no goals.

Honours

Individual
Liga Panameña de Fútbol Top Scorer (1):
2009 (A) II

References

External links
 
 

1990 births
Living people
Sportspeople from Panama City
Association football wingers
Panamanian footballers
Panama international footballers
Categoría Primera A players
Liga Nacional de Fútbol de Guatemala players
Liga FPD players
Liga Panameña de Fútbol players
Chepo FC players
Sporting San Miguelito players
La Equidad footballers
San Francisco F.C. players
Municipal Pérez Zeledón footballers
C.D. Árabe Unido players
Deportivo Coatepeque players
Monagas S.C. players
Tauro F.C. players
C.D. Sonsonate footballers
Unión Comercio footballers
Santa Tecla F.C. footballers
C.D. Plaza Amador players
C.D. Luis Ángel Firpo footballers
Panamanian expatriate footballers
Panamanian expatriate sportspeople in Colombia
Expatriate footballers in Colombia
Panamanian expatriate sportspeople in Costa Rica
Expatriate footballers in Costa Rica
Panamanian expatriate sportspeople in Guatemala
Expatriate footballers in Guatemala
Panamanian expatriate sportspeople in Venezuela
Expatriate footballers in Venezuela
Panamanian expatriate sportspeople in El Salvador
Expatriate footballers in El Salvador
Panamanian expatriate sportspeople in Peru
Expatriate footballers in Peru
Panama under-20 international footballers
Panama youth international footballers